Dmitri Vladimirovich Vyazmikin (born 27 September 1972) is a Russian football coach and a former player. He was a striker. Dmitri Vyazmikin is most famous for becoming Russian Top Division top scorer in 2001.

Club career
Vyazmikin played in various leagues of Russian football, including Russian Top Division in 1997-2003. In 2000, he won the league bronze medals with Torpedo Moscow, and in 2001 he became the league top scorer with 18 goals in 29 matches.

Dmitri Vyazmikin has also scored two goals for Torpedo Moscow in the UEFA Cup 2001-02.

Honours
 Russian Top Division top scorer: 2001 (18 goals).
 Russian Second Division Zone West top scorer: 2004 (25 goals).
 Russian Second Division, Zone West best player: 2004, 2009, 2010.

References

External links 

 Club profile 
 

1972 births
Living people
People from Vladimir, Russia
FC Torpedo Moscow players
FC Shinnik Yaroslavl players
Russian Premier League players
FC Elista players
FC Spartak Vladikavkaz players
FC Lokomotiv Nizhny Novgorod players
FC Sokol Saratov players
Russian footballers
Association football forwards
Russian football managers
FC Spartak Kostroma players
FC Torpedo Vladimir players
Sportspeople from Vladimir Oblast